Julien Vermote (born 2 October 1949 in Kortrijk, Belgium) is a former Belgian professional road and track cyclist. His booked his mayor victory during De Vlaamse Pijl in 1968 and 1970. His father and the grandfather of his namesake and fellow professional cyclist Julien Vermote were nephews.

Palmarès

1968
1st, De Vlaamse Pijl
1969
2nd, De Vlaamse Pijl
1970
1st, De Vlaamse Pijl

References

External links

1949 births
Living people
Belgian male cyclists
Sportspeople from Kortrijk
Cyclists from West Flanders